Horopito may refer to:

Horopito, the name of two plant species in the genus Pseudowintera in the Māori language
Horopito, New Zealand, a location in the North Island of New Zealand